Leksand Municipality (Leksands kommun) is a municipality in Dalarna County in central Sweden. Its seat is located in the town of Leksand.

In 1974 "old"  Leksand was amalgamated with Ål and reunited with Siljansnäs (which had been separated from it in 1875).

Geography

The municipality is located alongside the Österdalälven, (Österdal River), and the town is at the southern shore of lake Siljan.

The culture is marked by being in the heart of the culture rich Dalarna. There is a substantial old town section in Leksand, with preserved old cottages as a landmark.

Localities

 Alvik
 Djura
 Häradsbygden
 Insjön
 Leksand (seat)
 Siljansnäs
 Tällberg
 Västanvik

Economy
Most companies are small enterprises, covering several sectors. To the larger belong:
Clas Ohlson (Sweden's largest department store chain, which was founded in Insjön)
 Leksandsbröd (Swedish crispbread)
 Bergkvist-Insjön (Wood factory)
Tomoku Hus (Houses for export to Japan)
 Leksands IF (Sport organization)
 Ejendals

In the 2002 list of Swedish Industry Climate, Leksand Municipality was ranked 15 of 289 investigated municipalities.

Riksdag elections

Notability
One of Sweden's most popular ice hockey teams is Leksands IF. NHL goalkeeper Johan Hedberg hails from Leksand.
In addition, one of Sweden's best baseball teams (Leksand Lumberjacks) plays in Leksand.
Along with Mora, Leksand co-hosted the 2007 World Junior Ice Hockey Championships. The European Go Congress was held in Leksand in 2008.

Twin towns – sister cities

Leksand is twinned with:

 Aurora, Canada
 Brainerd, United States
 Hørsholm, Denmark
 Karksi-Nuia (Mulgi), Estonia
 Lillehammer, Norway
 Oulainen, Finland
 Tōbetsu, Japan

References

External links

Official website

Municipalities of Dalarna County